Alvin Queen is an American-born Swiss jazz drummer born in the Bronx, New York, on August 16, 1950. At 16, he played for Ruth Brown and Don Pullen and with the Wild Bill Davis trio. He played with trombonist Benny Green and guitarist Tiny Grimes in 1969 and replaced Billy Cobham in the Horace Silver quintet. He also played with the George Benson quartet before rejoining Charles Tolliver in November 1971. During the seventies, he lived in Canada, before settling in Switzerland in 1979 and creating the label Nilva, an anagram of his first name.

He has also played with Michael Brecker, Kenny Drew, Oscar Peterson, Bennie Wallace, Duško Gojković, Johnny Griffin, and George Coleman.

Discography

As leader
 Alvin Queen in Europe (Nilva, 1980)
 Ashanti (Nilva, 1981)
 Glidin' and Stridin'  (Nilva, 1981) with Junior Mance
 A Day in Holland (Nilva, 1983) with Dusko Goykovich
 Lenox and Seventh (Black and Blue, 1985) with Dr. Lonnie Smith
 Jammin' Uptown (Nilva, 1985)
 I'm Back (Nilva, 1992)
 I Ain't Looking at You (Justin Time, 2005)
 Mighty Long Way (Justin Time, 2008)

As sideman
With George Coleman
 At Yoshi's (Theresa, 1989)
With Eddie "Lockjaw" Davis
 Jaw's Blues (Enja, 1981)
With John Hicks and Elise Wood
Luminous (Nilva, 1988)
With Horace Parlan
Pannonica (Enja, 1981 [1984])
With John Patton
 Soul Connection (Nilva, 1983)
With Pharoah Sanders
 A Prayer Before Dawn (Theresa, 1987)
With Charles Tolliver
 Impact (Enja, 1972)
 Live at the Loosdrecht Jazz Festival (Strata-East, 1973)
With Warren Vaché
Talk to Me Baby (Muse, 1996)

With Pierre Boussaguet 

 Charme (Polydor 1998)

References

External links 
 Official website

1950 births
African-American drummers
American jazz drummers
Bebop drummers
Hard bop drummers
Post-bop drummers
People from the Bronx
Living people
Musicians from New York City
American emigrants to Switzerland
20th-century American drummers
American male drummers
Jazz musicians from New York (state)
20th-century American male musicians
American male jazz musicians
Black & Blue Records artists
Justin Time Records artists
20th-century African-American musicians
21st-century African-American people